Korir is a surname. Notable people with the surname include: 

Albert Korir (born 1994), Kenyan long-distance runner
Emmanuel Korir (born 1995), Kenyan middle-distance runner
Japhet Korir (born 1993), Kenyan long-distance runner
John Cheruiyot Korir (born 1981), Kenyan middle and long-distance runner
John Korir Kipsang (born 1975), Kenyan middle and long-distance runner
Julius Korir (born 1960), Kenyan middle and long-distance runner
Mark Korir (born 1985), Kenyan long-distance runner
Sammy Korir (born 1971), Kenyan middle and long-distance runner
Paul Korir (born 1977), Kenyan middle and long-distance runner
Shedrack Kibet Korir  (born 1978), Kenyan middle and long-distance runner
Wesley Korir (born 1982), Kenyan long-distance runner and politician

See also
Kipkorir, related surname meaning a boy born towards morning
Jepkorir, related surname meaning a girl born around 6:30am